Woodham Mortimer is a village on the Dengie peninsula about three miles west-south-west of Maldon in the English county of Essex. The village is part of the Wickham Bishops and Woodham ward of the Maldon district.

History

The discovery of a hoard of denarii dated to 41 CE is some evidence of occupation in Roman times. However, the village first appears in written records as "Wudeham" in c. 975. The name, which means "village in the wood", is derived from the old English words "wudu" (wood in modern English) and "ham" (home, or homestead). At the time of the Norman Conquest the parish belonged to Ralph Peverell and was known as Little Woodham. Henry II gave the parish to Robert de Mortimer, leading to the change in name.

In the Domesday Book the population was recorded as 14 households with the local lord in 1066 being Siward Barn.

During the First World War a new aerodrome was opened in nearby Stow Maries to provide air cover for the London area. 37 Squadron, Royal Flying Corps occupied the base from September 1916 taking over The Grange in Woodham Mortimer as its headquarters. The Grange was once the property of Beeleigh Abbey and is a Grade II listed building.

Demographics

Approximately 45% of residents are classified using Experian's Mosaic system as type A4 (defined as 'financially secure couples, many close to retirement, living in sought after suburbs') and are predominantly white, Christian, English speaking and British born. As of 2009 the population was estimated at 641.

Governance
Woodham Mortimer has a parish council and is part of the Wickham Bishops and Woodham ward of the Maldon district. The district forms part of the Witham constituency for parliamentary elections. The local MP is Priti Patel.

Geography
The geology of the area is rock, sand and gravels that were deposited by the retreating ice. The National Soil Resources Institute at Cranfield University describes the main soil type as "slowly permeable seasonally wet slightly acid but base-rich loamy and clayey soils."

Climate

Woodham Mortimer is considered by the Met Office to be part of the Eastern England region, however, for the purposes of historical climate data it is consolidated into the East Anglia region. Climate information for the period 1981 – 2010 is detailed below.

Economy

There are two public houses, the Royal Oak on the A414 and the Hurdlemakers Arms on Post Office Road. Its name refers to the hurdles which used to be made from materials cut in the nearby woods. There is a golf driving range with 9-hole pitch and putt that was opened in 1967 on Burnham Road.

Crime

Woodham Mortimer is policed by Essex Police and is part of the Purleigh Neighbourhood Policing Team which covers a number of areas with a total population of 10,936. In 2011, there were 516 reported crimes in the NPT. There is no local police station.

Culture and facilities

Village hall

Next to the village hall is a  playing field with swings and a small football pitch.

Religious sites

The parish church is St Margaret's. The original church on the site may date from the 16th century, however, it was rebuilt in the 19th century leaving little evidence of the older church with only the south wall and east end remaining.

Evidence for the age of the church includes the 13th century font (although the base is newer) and the 17th century carvings on the pulpit. The church has a small window commemorating Queen Victoria's diamond jubilee. The graveyard includes the grave of Peter Chamberlen.

Landmarks

Woodham Mortimer Hall is a 17th-century gabled house that Hugh and Peter Chamberlen lived in. There is a blue plaque fixed to the hall noting them as pioneering obstetricians who invented the forceps. The hall passed out of the Chamberlen family in 1715 when the family home was sold. The forceps were found in 1813 under a trap door in the loft of the hall and given to the Medical and Chirurgical Society which passed them to the Royal Society of Medicine in 1818. The find was described by R. Lee in Observations on the Discovery of the Original Obstetric Instruments of the Chamberlens (1862) as:

There is a war memorial commemorating the nine people from the village who died during the World Wars. There is also a Grade II listed memorial erected in 1825 to William Alexander, who left his lands to the Worshipful Company of Coopers for the benefit of the poor.

Woodham Mortimer Lodge is a Grade II listed building.

References

Villages in Essex